In mathematics, a block matrix pseudoinverse is a formula for the pseudoinverse of a partitioned matrix. This is useful for decomposing or approximating many algorithms updating parameters in signal processing, which are based on the least squares method.

Derivation 
Consider a column-wise partitioned matrix:

If the above matrix is full rank, the Moore–Penrose inverse matrices of it and its transpose are

This computation of the pseudoinverse requires (n + p)-square matrix inversion and does not take advantage of the block form.

To reduce computational costs to n- and p-square matrix inversions and to introduce parallelism, treating the blocks separately, one derives 

where orthogonal projection matrices are defined by

The above formulas are not necessarily valid if  does not have full rank – for example, if , then

Application to least squares problems 

Given the same matrices as above, we consider the following least squares problems, which
appear as multiple objective optimizations or constrained problems in signal processing.
Eventually, we can implement a parallel algorithm for least squares based on the following results.

Column-wise partitioning in over-determined least squares 

Suppose a solution  solves an over-determined system:

Using the block matrix pseudoinverse, we have

Therefore, we have a decomposed solution:

Row-wise partitioning in under-determined least squares 

Suppose a solution  solves an under-determined system:

The minimum-norm solution is given by

Using the block matrix pseudoinverse, we have

Comments on matrix inversion 

In a dense and small system, we can use singular value decomposition, QR decomposition, or Cholesky decomposition to replace the matrix inversions with numerical routines. In a large system, we may employ iterative methods such as Krylov subspace methods.

Then, we finish to compute  and  also in parallel.

See also

References

External links 
 The Matrix Reference Manual by Mike Brookes
 Linear Algebra Glossary by John Burkardt
 The Matrix Cookbook by Kaare Brandt Petersen
 Lecture 8: Least-norm solutions of undetermined equations by Stephen P. Boyd

Numerical linear algebra
Matrix theory